Olmo is a surname. Notable people with the surname include:

Antonio Olmo (born 1954), Spanish footballer
Dani Olmo (born 1998), Spanish footballer
Giuseppe Olmo (1911–1992), Italian road bicycle racer
Harold Olmo (1909–2006), American viticulturist
Jesús Olmo (born 1985), Spanish footballer
Luis Olmo (1919-2017), Puerto Rican retired baseball player who played in Major League Baseball
Michael Olmo (born 1999), American rapper and singer known professionally as Iann Dior
Miquel Olmo (born 1966), Spanish retired footballer
Walter Olmo, Italian musician and composer

Italian-language surnames